The Age of Anxiety: A Baroque Eclogue (1947; first UK edition, 1948) is a long poem in six parts by W. H. Auden, written mostly in a modern version of Anglo-Saxon alliterative verse.

The poem deals, in eclogue form, with man's quest to find substance and identity in a shifting and increasingly industrialized world. Set in a wartime bar in New York City, Auden uses four characters – Quant, Malin, Rosetta, and Emble – to explore and develop his themes.

The poem won the Pulitzer Prize for Poetry in 1948.

A critical edition of the poem, edited by Alan Jacobs, was published by Princeton University Press in 2011.

Influence
The poem inspired Leonard Bernstein's 1949 Symphony No. 2, also known as The Age of Anxiety, which in turn was used for both a 1950 ballet by Jerome Robbins and a 2014 ballet by Liam Scarlett.

"The Age of Anxiety" is the title of the first chapter of The Wisdom of Insecurity by Alan Watts (1951).

Musician Pete Townshend's first novel, published in 2019, is also titled The Age of Anxiety.

References

External links
 The W. H. Auden Society
 The Guardian's Book Review, 10 Apr 2010

1947 books
Books by W. H. Auden
Poetry by W. H. Auden
Pulitzer Prize for Poetry-winning works
Random House books